David E. Hofmans (born January 27, 1943, in Los Angeles, California) is an American trainer of Thoroughbred racehorses. Born and raised in Los Angeles, when he was a boy his father brought him to watch horse racing at area tracks. While a student at Pasadena City College, he became friends with Gary Jones, the son of a horse trainer and a future trainer himself. Hofmans began learning the business as a groom and hot walker for Jones' father.

As a professional trainer, Hofmans earned his first win in 1974 at Santa Anita Racetrack. After success on California race tracks, in 1996 he gained national attention as the trainer of Alphabet Soup, who defeated the great Cigar in the Breeders' Cup Classic. Training for prominent horseman and Magna Entertainment Corp. chair Frank Stronach, in 1997 Hofmans won Canada's most prestigious race, the Queen's Plate, with Awesome Again and won the Belmont Stakes that saw his colt Touch Gold end Silver Charm's bid for the U.S.Triple Crown. Hofmans won his second Breeders' Cup race in 2003 when Adoration captured the Breeders' Cup Distaff and his third with Desert Code's victory in the 2008 Breeders' Cup Turf Sprint.

In 2006, Hofmans was nominated for induction into the National Museum of Racing and Hall of Fame.

References
 David Hofmans' profile at the NTRA

1943 births
American horse trainers
Sportspeople from Los Angeles
Living people